Alaena brainei, the Braine's Zulu, is a butterfly in the family Lycaenidae. It is found in north-central Namibia. The habitat consists of rocky grassland.

Adults are on wing from November to the beginning of May.

Larvae feed on algae (Cyanobacteria) growing on rocks.

References

Butterflies described in 1976
Alaena
Endemic fauna of Namibia
Butterflies of Africa